Silvia Farina Elia and Francesca Schiavone were the defending champions, but they chose not to compete that year together.

Farina Elia partnered with Vera Zvonareva. 
Schiavone partnered with Daniela Hantuchová.

Tatiana Perebiynis and Barbora Strýcová won in the final 6-1, 6-4 against Klaudia Jans and Alicja Rosolska

Seeds

Draw

Draw

External links
Draw

JandS Cup - Doubles